Atchee is a ghost town in Garfield County, Colorado. It was originally a railroad village/company town owned by the Gilsonite Company that served as a shopping town on a narrow-gauge railway. The railroad served mines in nearby Utah. At a point in time, the railroad was dismantled which led to a sharp population decline. By 1938, there were only 27 voters in the town and by 1940 only two voters remained.

Town life
The town was a company town and thus almost everyone in the town worked for the Gilsonite Company. The houses all had running water and steam heat as well as being served by electricity. Atchee was never an incorporated town.

Rail line
The rail line was the lifeblood of the town, with the town's population sharply declining and eventually falling into ghost town status after the demolition of the rail line. The line itself ran from Mack, Colorado to Watson, Utah with a spur to the Rainbow Mine in Utah from Watson. During the summer, there were special trains run for students of the Colorado School of Mines.

References

Unincorporated communities in Colorado